Arue may refer to:

France 
Arue is the name of two communes of France:
Arue, Landes in the Landes département
Arue, French Polynesia in the overseas territory of French Polynesia

Music
 "Arue" (song) a song by Bump Of Chicken